The Yoruba Revolutionary Wars, otherwise known as the Yoruba Civil Wars ( 1789–1880), were a series of conflicts that engulfed the Yoruba-speaking areas of West Africa in the late 18th and early 19th centuries. Robin Law summarizes the causes of the wars as the disintegration of the old Oyo Empire after the death of Alaafin Abiodun in 1789 and a resurgence of long-standing quarrels between the provincial chiefs over various issues. The root of the first disagreements can be traced to the feud between two noble houses; Laderin, based in Ilorin, and Yamba, based in the capital at Oyo-Ile. The conflict was also exacerbated by a Muslim slave rebellion led by a Fulani Muslim cleric, Shehu Alimi, and sponsored by the Aare Ona Kakanfo, Afonja, a descendant of Laderin, the founder of Ilorin, in 1817.

History 

Earlier in the 18th century, in 1747, after Dahomey was added to the empire, Basorun Gaha of the House of Yau Yamba, the head of the  Oyo Mesi, the most senior line of Yoruba chiefs, led a popular revolt against a despotic Alaafin, Labisi, who was viewed by the Oyo Mesi as being manipulated by his provincial chiefs. The provincial chiefs, led by Ilorin's Baale Pasin of the House of Laderin, paused the remission of taxes to Oyo-Ile as a result. Gaha responded by sending a strong force to Ilorin, Pasin fled to Ola, a dependency of Ilorin, where he was hunted down and killed by forces loyal to Gaha. Although Basorun Gaha was defeated in 1774 by a coalition of Oyo-Ile chiefs, provincial chiefs and Abiodun (at the time an Oyo prince), this event highlighted provincial dissatisfaction in the way Oyo administered its territories.

Alaafin Abiodun ruled the empire in an uneasy peace from 1774 until his death in 1789. According to oral tradition, this period saw further expansion and decentralization of authority. It was also during Abiodun's reign that the law prohibiting the bearers of the Abaja tribal mark, from being enslaved, was enacted. This law severely affected the livelihood of the provincial chiefs and some members of the Oyo imperial family. It also led to the sourcing of Muslim slaves from Northern Hausa, Bariba and Nupe towns; some of these slaves were then exported to Europe and the Americas via the Port of Ajase. Islam arrived in Yorubaland in the 14th century during the reign of Musa I of Mali, however, conversions were not widespread until 1655, when the first Mosque was built in Iwo, followed by Iseyin in 1760, Lagos in 1774, Saki in 1790 and Osogbo in 1889. In 1817, Afonja took advantage of a Muslim revolt in Oyo-Ile by calling all Muslim interests in the empire in an effort to enhance his support. This move backfired as he was murdered in a palace coup by his warrior band, then known as the Jamaa. The weakened Oyo empire leading to the rapid rise of the Ibadan city-state as an empire prompted the culmination of the decades of warring into the Kiriji War. 

All of these quarrels weakened central authority and gave rise to regional autonomy. They vastly affected the sociopolitical landscape of the Yoruba country and expanded the scope of the slave trade in the 19th century.  Some of the victims of these wars became Christian converts in Sierra Leone. The most notable effect was the creation of new States; Ibadan, Abeokuta and Ijaye. It also saw the rise and fall of some of the most influential figures in Yoruba History; Kurunmi in Ijaye, Basorun Oluyole, Aare Latoosa, Efunsetan Aniwura and Balogun Ogunmola in Ibadan, Biodun Fabunmi in Ekiti, Ogedengbe of Ilesa, Efunroye Tinubu, Kosoko in Lagos, Arilekolasi in Ondo and many more. It also severely weakened Oyo suzerainty over the area, eventually paving the way for British annexation in the late 1800s under the guise of ending the slave trade.

References 

Military history of Nigeria
Yoruba history
Conflicts in Africa